The Treasures of Agra is a 1983 Soviet television film, the fourth of five in the series The Adventures of Sherlock Holmes and Dr. Watson. It was directed by Igor Maslennikov.

It starred Vasily Livanov as Sherlock Holmes and Vitaly Solomin as Dr. Watson.

It consists of two episodes: Part One, based on Arthur Conan Doyle's 1890 novel The Sign of the Four (beginning), and Part Two, based on  his 1891 short story "A Scandal in Bohemia" and The Sign of the Four (continuation and conclusion).

References

External links

1983 films
1980s Russian-language films
Films based on British novels
Films based on mystery novels
Sherlock Holmes films based on works by Arthur Conan Doyle
Lenfilm films
Soviet television miniseries
Films directed by Igor Maslennikov
1980s Soviet television series
Soviet crime films
Russian crime films
1980s television miniseries
Soviet crime television series